The 1992 Dynasty Cup was a football competition for the top four teams of East Asia. The second edition of the Dynasty Cup was held from 22 to 29 August 1992 in China. The competition was won by Japan.

Participating teams

Results

Group stage

Final

References
1992 Dynasty Cup at Rsssf

1992
1992 in Asian football
1992 in Chinese football
1992 in Japanese football
1992 in South Korean football
1992 in North Korean football
1992